Election Night is a 1998 Danish short comedy film directed by Anders Thomas Jensen. It won an Oscar in 1999 for Best Short Subject.

Cast
 Ulrich Thomsen as Peter
 Jens Jørn Spottag as Carl
 John Martinus as Taxi Driver 2
 Ole Thestrup as Taxi Driver 1
 Farshad Kholghi as Taxi Driver 3
 Hella Joof as Woman
 Mikkel Vadsholt as Bartender
 Nicolas Bro as Man
 Thomas Milton Walther as Taxi Driver 4

Plot summary 
Peter arrives at a bar, forgetting that it is election day and that he forgot to vote. He takes a cab, but after the driver espouses racist views, he leaves and takes another. The new cab driver seems to be a Nazi, and Peter leaves again for another cab, but the driver, an immigrant who tells Peter that he will soon gain citizenship, espouses racism against Japanese people. Peter leaves the cab and encounters a man wearing a hat with the Confederate battle flag, asking Peter if he wants a ride. Peter runs to the polling place and does not make it in time. He tries convincing the poll worker, who is non-white, that he should be able to vote, telling the worker that he does it “for people like you”; a man subsequently punches Peter after perceiving him as racist.

References

External links
 

1998 films
1998 comedy films
1998 short films
Danish comedy films
Danish short films
1990s Danish-language films
Films about elections
Films directed by Anders Thomas Jensen
Films with screenplays by Anders Thomas Jensen
Live Action Short Film Academy Award winners
Comedy short films